Mad Animals (Italian:Animali pazzi) is a 1939 Italian "white-telephones" comedy film directed by Carlo Ludovico Bragaglia and starring Totò, Luisa Ferida and Calisto Bertramo. It was made at the Titanus Studios in Rome.

Plot
Baron Tolomeo dei Tolemei is about to receive the inheritance of a relative, just died. The legacy, however, as he wants the will, must go in part to finance a medical structure for crazy animals. Only then Baron Tolomeo may have the rich heritage. The affair proves complicated, because Tolomeo has a love affair with the beautiful Maria Luisa. The troubles continue when in life of Tolomeo breaks his poor twin-brother Antonio, physically like him, who secretly falls in love with Maria Luisa.

Cast
 Totò as Barone Tolomeo dei Tolomei/His brother
 Luisa Ferida as Maria Luisa 
 Calisto Bertramo as Fabrizio, il maggiordomo 
 Lilia Dale as Ninetta 
 Dina Perbellini as La direttrice dell'ospedale degli animali 
 Bianca Stagno Bellincioni as Zia Elisa 
 Claudio Ermelli as Il notaio 
 Raffaele Giachini as Il pretendente 
 Cesare Polacco as Il creditore 
 Pina Gallini as La proprietaria del cavallo pazzo

References

Bibliography
 Moliterno, Gino. Historical Dictionary of Italian Cinema. Scarecrow Press, 2008.

External links

1939 films
Italian comedy films
1939 comedy films
1930s Italian-language films
Films directed by Carlo Ludovico Bragaglia
Italian black-and-white films
1930s Italian films